William Harrison Adams (March 23, 1872 – September 24, 1958) was an American politician who served in the Virginia House of Delegates.

He died in Richmond on September 24, 1958, and was buried at Oakwood Cemetery.

References

External links 

1872 births
1958 deaths
Democratic Party members of the Virginia House of Delegates
20th-century American politicians